Dr. Anna Hiss (1893–1972) was a 20th-century American professor, instrumental in improving the field of physical education by professionalizing the field, establishing university degrees, and developing programs for preparing physical education teachers.  She was also professor of physical education at the University of Texas at Austin, as well as older sister of Donald Hiss and Alger Hiss.

Background

Anna Hiss was born on May 11, 1893, in Baltimore, Maryland, to Mary "Minnie" Lavinia (née Hughes) and Charles Alger Hiss.  She was the eldest of five children:  Anna, Mary Ann (1895), Bosley (1900), Alger (1904), and Donald (1906).  In 1906, her father committed suicide. In 1926, her brother Bosley Hiss died of Bright's disease. In 1929, her sister Mary Ann committed suicide.

As a child, she attended the Aloha Kanaka camp.  She studied at Bryn Mawr School, then Hollins College (1911–1912), and graduate from the Sargent School of Physical Education in Boston (1917).

Career 

Hiss taught briefly at the Friends School in Baltimore.

UT Austin

In 1918, Hiss started teaching at the University of Texas and served there 36 years until retirement in 1957.

In 1918, her first role was to teach "physical training" to women.  In 1921, she received promotion to director. In 1925, her four-year curriculum to train teachers in women's physical education received approval.  By 1948, she had become a full professor.  Harry Ransom had her designed professor emeritus upon her retirement.

From 1921 to 1929, she founded sports clubs on campus, including swimming, dance, tennis, horseback riding, fencing, and archery.  In the late 1920s, she secured funding for a women's gymnasium, built in 1931.  During the 1930s, she administered a three-year course for physical training called "Freshman Fundamentals."  She had tennis courts constructed and playing fields for field hockey, archery, golf, and volleyball.

In 1923, she helped found the Texas Athletic Federation of College Women, which she directed for its first four years.

Delta Kappa Gamma

Hiss co-founded the Delta Kappa Gamma, national teachers honor society.

Personal and death

Anna Hiss never married.

Hiss continued her own higher education, earning a BS from Columbia University (1936) and conducting graduate studies at the University of Colorado, University of Wisconsin, Stanford University, Columbia University, Mills College, and abroad.  In 1949, Boston University awarded her an honorary doctorate.

She studiously avoided publicity during the criminal trials against her brother Alger Hiss.  During his imprisonment, she was one of only seven people with whom he corresponded.

She did not support intercollegiate sports.

She petitioned to have the Speedway closed through campus.

Anna Hiss died age 79 on January 28, 1972, at Long Green nursing home in Baltimore.

Publications

Hiss contributed articles to the Journal of Health and Physical Education.

Awards, honors, legacy

In summing up her career, Delta Kappa Gamma stated: "She was instrumental in the establishment of the professional degree for physical education and the program for the preparation of teachers in the physical education field."

 1949: Honorary Doctorate from Boston University
 1972: Rededication of the Anna Hiss Gymnasium University of Texas at Austin

See also
Alger Hiss
Donald Hiss

References

American sportswomen
1893 births
1979 deaths
People from Baltimore
People from Austin, Texas
Female sports coaches
University of Texas faculty
Bryn Mawr School people
Boston University College of Health and Rehabilitation Sciences (Sargent College) alumni
20th-century American women
20th-century American people
American women academics